Jasper Ockeloen (born 10 May 1990 in Dordrecht) is a Dutch cyclist, who rides for Dutch amateur team Sockeloen Cycling Club.

He is the founder of Sockeloen, a company that designs and makes cycling socks, and of the Sockeloen Cycling Club as a means to promote mountain bike marathons and beach racing. Those two disciplines have races where professionals and amateurs can ride together and bond. He himself was introduced to beach racing by his girlfriend Riejanne Markus, a professional cyclist.

Major results

Road

2008
 1st  Road race, National Junior Road Championships
 9th Overall Giro della Lunigiana
2010
 8th Ronde van Midden-Nederland
2014
 9th Overall Sibiu Cycling Tour
 9th Arno Wallaard Memorial
2015
 2nd Overall Tour d'Azerbaïdjan
 2nd Overall Flèche du Sud
 3rd Overall Tour of Fuzhou
 7th Overall Tour de Taiwan
 9th Rutland–Melton CiCLE Classic

Mountain bike
2014
 1st  National Beach Race Championships
2016
 1st  UEC European Beach Race Championships
 1st  Cross-country marathon, National Championships
2017
 1st  UEC European Beach Race Championships
 National Championships
2nd Cross-country marathon
5th Cross-country
2018
 1st  National Beach Race Championships

References

External links

Jasper Ockeloen profile at the Royal Dutch Cycling Union website

1990 births
Living people
Dutch male cyclists
Sportspeople from Dordrecht
Cyclists from South Holland
20th-century Dutch people
21st-century Dutch people